Awal is an ancient name of Bahrain, an island country in the Persian Gulf. The name Awal had remained in use, probably for eight centuries. Awal Premi was derived from the name of a god that used to be worshiped by the inhabitants of the islands before the advent of Islam. Awal resembled the head of an ox. As for the meaning of this name, there are ʼawwal 'first, first part, previous'; ʼawwalan 'firstly, at first'; ʼawwalī 'prime, primordial, original'. 

Before Islam, Bahrain's administrative name was Mishmahig  and it was also called Tylos by the Ancient Greeks. If the name Tylos is related to  'rope with which the feet of draught-cattle are tied together', then the cattle representation of this deity may be thus confirmed.

See also 
 History of Bahrain
 Munzir ibn Sawa Al Tamimi

References 

History of Bahrain
Arabian gods